is a Japanese modern pentathlete. He competed at the 1960 Summer Olympics.

References

External links
 

1936 births
Living people
Japanese male modern pentathletes
Olympic modern pentathletes of Japan
Modern pentathletes at the 1960 Summer Olympics
Sportspeople from Fukuoka (city)
20th-century Japanese people
21st-century Japanese people